Travis Keenan Ismaiel (born 2 June 1992 in Cape Town) is a South African rugby union player for the  in Super Rugby. His regular position is winger.

Career

Youth
He played for the  team in the 2011 Under-19 Provincial Championship competition and for the  team in 2012 and 2013.

He was included in the South Africa Under-20 squad for the 2012 IRB Junior World Championship competition and made one appearance for them, in their pool stage match against Italy. He was also an unused substitute in the final against New Zealand.

Blue Bulls
He made seven appearances in total in that competition, scoring six tries.

His Currie Cup debut came later in the same year, when he was included in the Blue Bulls starting team to face  in the opening match of the 2013 Currie Cup Premier Division season.

South Africa 'A'

In 2016, Ismaiel was included in a South Africa 'A' squad that played a two-match series against a touring England Saxons team. He was named in the starting line-up for their first match in Bloemfontein, but ended on the losing side as the visitors ran out 32–24 winners. He was named on the bench for the second match of the series, coming on as a second-half replacement in a 26–29 defeat to the Saxons in George.

Harlequins

On 2 July 2019, it was announced that Ismael would sign for English Premiership .

Return to Bulls
On 27 May 2020, Ismaiel will return to his Super Rugby side Bulls later in 2020, after his short stint in England.

References

South African rugby union players
Living people
1992 births
Rugby union players from Cape Town
Blue Bulls players
South Africa Under-20 international rugby union players
South Africa international rugby union players
Rugby union wings
Bulls (rugby union) players
Harlequin F.C. players